Timo Juhani Grönlund (born 3 July 1987) is a Finnish-Bolivian cross-country skier. He competed in the men's 15 kilometre freestyle at the 2018 Winter Olympics. Grönlund is from Finland, but he has competed internationally for Bolivia since 2017. He qualified to represent Bolivia at the 2022 Winter Olympics.

Grönlund married a Bolivian woman in 2011, and moved to La Paz, Bolivia, in 2014.

Cross-country skiing results
All results are sourced from the International Ski Federation (FIS).

Olympic Games

World Championships

References

External links
 

1987 births
Living people
Bolivian male cross-country skiers
Finnish male cross-country skiers
Olympic cross-country skiers of Bolivia
Cross-country skiers at the 2018 Winter Olympics
Cross-country skiers at the 2022 Winter Olympics
People from Kitee
Naturalized citizens of Bolivia
Bolivian people of European descent
Finnish emigrants
Finnish emigrants to Bolivia
Sportspeople from North Karelia